Fleabag is a British comedy-drama television series created and written by Phoebe Waller-Bridge, based on her one-woman show first performed in 2013 at the Edinburgh Fringe Festival. It was originally produced by Two Brothers Pictures for digital channel BBC Three in a co-production agreement with Amazon Studios. Waller-Bridge stars as the title character, a free-spirited but angry and confused young woman in London. Sian Clifford stars as Fleabag's sister Claire, while Andrew Scott joined the cast in the second series as 'Hot Priest'. The protagonist frequently breaks the fourth wall to provide exposition, internal monologues, and a running commentary to the audience.

The show premiered on 21 July 2016 and concluded its second and final series on 8 April 2019. It received widespread acclaim from critics, particularly for its writing, acting, and the uniqueness and personality of the title character. Waller-Bridge won the British Academy Television Award for Best Female Comedy Performance for the first series. The second series received 11 Primetime Emmy Award nominations and won six, with Waller-Bridge earning Outstanding Comedy Series, Outstanding Lead Actress, and Outstanding Writing for a Comedy Series; additional acting nominations were received by Clifford, Olivia Colman, and guest stars Fiona Shaw and Kristin Scott Thomas. The series received the Golden Globe Award for Best Television Series and Best Actress for Waller-Bridge, and a nomination for Scott.

Background
The show is adapted from Waller-Bridge's 2013 Edinburgh Festival Fringe one-woman play of the same name which won a Fringe First Award. The initial idea of the character of Fleabag came from a challenge by a friend, where Waller-Bridge was given the task of creating a sketch for a 10-minute section in a stand-up storytelling night.

Cast and characters

Main
 Phoebe Waller-Bridge as Fleabag (although never named in the script)
 Sian Clifford as Claire, Fleabag's sister with whom she shares an uneasy relationship
 Andrew Scott as the priest, with whom Fleabag falls in love (series 2)

Supporting
 Olivia Colman as Fleabag and Claire's godmother, who began a relationship with their father not long after their mother's death and eventually becomes their stepmother
 Bill Paterson as father of Fleabag and Claire
 Brett Gelman as Martin, Claire's husband
 Hugh Skinner as Harry, Fleabag's ex-boyfriend
 Hugh Dennis as Bank Manager, approached by Fleabag for a loan (series 1; guest series 2)
 Ben Aldridge as Arsehole Guy, one of Fleabag's love interests, so named for his taste for anal sex (series 1; guest series 2)
 Jenny Rainsford as Boo, Fleabag's deceased best friend and business partner

Guest
 Jamie Demetriou as Bus Rodent, one of Fleabag's love interests (series 1)
 Fiona Shaw as Fleabag's counsellor (series 2)
 Kristin Scott Thomas as Belinda, a successful businesswoman who meets Fleabag at an awards ceremony presented by Claire (series 2)
 Ray Fearon as Hot Misogynist, who serves as Fleabag's lawyer and one of her love interests (series 2)
 Christian Hillborg as Klare, Claire's Finnish business partner and love interest (series 2)
 Jo Martin as Pam, who works at the priest's church (series 2)
 Angus Imrie as Jake, Martin's teenage son and Claire's step-son (series 2)

Episodes

Series 1 (2016)

Series 2 (2019)

Distribution and broadcast

BBC Three was the original broadcast channel for the show with a repeat run broadcast on BBC Two between 21 August and 25 September 2016. The second series was broadcast on BBC One at the same time as being released on BBC Three, by this time only available online.

It was picked up by the on-demand Amazon Prime Video (formerly Amazon Video) service and premiered in the United States on 16 September 2016. Fleabag is also available on IFC in the US. In the Netherlands, it was picked up by Net5.

The show has been remade for French television by Jeanne Herry. Titled Mouche (French for 'fly', the insect), it started airing on 3 June 2019 on pay channel Canal+. Mouche is a close remake, though set in Paris with Camille Cottin in the starring role.

Reception

Critical response

Both series of Fleabag received widespread acclaim from television critics. At review aggregation website Rotten Tomatoes, both series received approval ratings of 100%. The first series received an average rating of 8.5/10, based on 42 reviews, with the site's critical consensus reading: "Clever and viciously funny, Fleabag is a touching, wildly inventive comedy about a complicated young woman navigating the aftermath of trauma." The second series received an average rating of 9.3/10, based on 97 reviews, with the critical consensus stating: "Fleabag jumps back into the fray with a bracing second season that upholds its predecessor's frenzied wit and delicate heart, replete with Phoebe Waller-Bridge's indefatigable charisma". At Metacritic, the first series received a weighted average score of 88 out of 100, based on 19 critics, while the second series received a score of 96, based on 21 critics, both signifying "universal acclaim".

Emily Nussbaum of The New Yorker described the first series as "a precision black-humor mechanism, a warped and affecting fable about one single woman's existence." Maureen Ryan at Variety called it "scathingly funny", concluding that "long after it’s pulled you in with its irreverence and jokes about sex, and beguiled you with its cutting wit and messily human characters, it reveals that it’s actually a tragedy". Hank Stuever of The Washington Post characterised it as a "funny, highly profane but surprisingly poignant dramedy". Mike Hale in The New York Times praised the show for its "restless, almost feral energy and its slap-in-the-face attitude." Mary McNamara of the Los Angeles Times commended its unpredictability, acting, and "clear eye for truth that often becomes, like all good comedy, quite devastating".

Serena Davies of The Daily Telegraph lauded the second series as "a near-perfect work of art". Mary Elizabeth Williams of Salon praised its "brilliant swan song", finding the series's conclusion satisfying and "well-earned". For Rolling Stone, Alan Sepinwall wrote that the "tragicomic masterpiece reaches new heights in its second outing". James Poniewozik of The New York Times wrote that "the new season feels immediately confident, if inevitably less groundbreaking. Yet it continues to push its form". Hannah Jane Parkinson of The Guardian described the conclusion as "the most electrifying, devastating TV in years", writing of the second series that "it seems as though many who either did not watch the first series, or who didn’t think it lived up to the hype, have been converted".

According to Metacritic's aggregate of decade-end lists, Fleabag was the second-highest ranked show of the 2010s. In 2019, it was ranked 8th on The Guardian'''s list of the 100 best TV shows of the 21st century.

Former United States President Barack Obama named the second season of Fleabag among his favorite films and television series of 2019. In his annual list, which he released on Twitter on 29 December 2019, he added a small addendum with the title, "and a quick list of TV shows that I considered as powerful as movies: Fleabag: Season 2, Unbelievable, and Watchmen.

In 2022, Rolling Stone ranked Fleabag'' as the fifth-greatest TV show of all time.

Accolades

Music
Waller-Bridge's sister, Isobel Waller-Bridge, composed the music for both series.

Home media

References

External links

 
 

2016 British television series debuts
2019 British television series endings
2010s British black comedy television series
2010s British comedy-drama television series
English-language television shows
Amazon Prime Video original programming
BBC comedy-drama television shows
Casual sex in television
Fictional characters who break the fourth wall
Metafictional television series
Self-reflexive television
Television series about sisters
Television series based on plays
Television series created by Phoebe Waller-Bridge
Television shows set in London
Television series by All3Media
Television series by BBC Studios
Best Musical or Comedy Series Golden Globe winners
Primetime Emmy Award for Outstanding Comedy Series winners
Primetime Emmy Award-winning television series